Edward Broadhurst  (2 July 1810 – 7 April 1883) was an English-born barrister and politician in colonial New South Wales.

He was born at Bath to the Reverend Thomas Broadhurst and Frances Whittaker. He studied at the University of Cambridge and in 1837 became a barrister. Later that year he migrated to New South Wales, and soon had a successful legal practice. On 7 May 1853 he married Harriett Lucy  Greenhill, with whom he had two children.

He was an appointed member of the New South Wales Legislative Council from 1851 to 1856, and was appointed to the reconstituted Council from 1856 to 1861. He was appointed Queen's Counsel on 17 August 1858, the fifth barrister in New South Wales to be appointed.

References

1810 births
1883 deaths
Members of the New South Wales Legislative Council
Australian King's Counsel
19th-century Australian politicians